Brendan White (born 16 April 1992), is an Australian professional footballer who plays as a goalkeeper for Heidelberg United.

Club career

Brisbane Roar
Brendan White signed on with Brisbane Roar as a mature-age rookie at the age of 25.

He made his Brisbane debut against Adelaide United as a substitute for Dylan Wenzel-Halls within a red card for Jamie Young. The result was a 4–3 loss.

Heidelberg United
Heidelberg United welcomes its newly signed goal keeper Brendan White to the club. Brendan comes to the Bergers from Brisbane Roar FC following a previous stint in the NPL with Port Melbourne FC in 2017

Melbourne Victory
In October 2019, White signed with Melbourne Victory as an injury replacement for Matt Acton. In February 2020, he was released by Melbourne Victory.

Brisbane Strikers 
White returned to Queensland in February, 2020, signing for National Premier Leagues club Brisbane Strikers.

Heidelberg United
White returned to Victoria in 2022, signing for National Premier Leagues Victoria club at Heidelberg United.

Career statistics

References

External links

1992 births
Living people
Australian soccer players
Association football goalkeepers
Gold Coast United FC players
Brisbane Roar FC players
Melbourne Victory FC players
Port Melbourne SC players
Heidelberg United FC players
National Premier Leagues players
A-League Men players
Brisbane Strikers FC players